Dr. Joseph Bennett Riddle House is a historic home located at Morganton, Burke County, North Carolina.  It was built about 1892, and is a 2-l/2-story, five bay, Queen Anne style frame house. It features a number of balconies, bay windows, and dormers. A three-story tower was added in about 1910.

It was listed on the National Register of Historic Places in 1984.

References

Houses on the National Register of Historic Places in North Carolina
Queen Anne architecture in North Carolina
Houses completed in 1892
Houses in Burke County, North Carolina
National Register of Historic Places in Burke County, North Carolina